Pseudomelampus is a monotypic genus of gastropods in the subfamily Pedipedinae belonging to the family Ellobiidae.

The only species is Pseudomelampus exiguus.

The species is found in Atlantic Ocean off the Canary Islands.

References

External links
 Pallary, P. (1900). Coquilles marines du littoral du département d'Oran. Journal de Conchyliologie. 48(3): 211-422.
 Gofas, S.; Le Renard, J.; Bouchet, P. (2001). Mollusca. in: Costello, M.J. et al. (eds), European Register of Marine Species: a check-list of the marine species in Europe and a bibliography of guides to their identification. Patrimoines Naturels. 50: 180-213

Ellobiidae